The Chevrolet Corvair is a compact car manufactured by Chevrolet for model years 1960–1969 in two generations. A response to the Volkswagen Beetle, it remains the only American-designed, mass-produced passenger car with a rear-mounted, air-cooled engine. The Corvair was manufactured and marketed in 4-door sedan, 2-door coupe, convertible, 4-door station wagon, passenger van, commercial van, and pickup truck body styles in its first generation (1960–1964) and as a 2-door coupe, convertible or 4-door hardtop in its second (1965–1969) – with a total production of approximately 1.8 million from 1960 until 1969.

The name "Corvair" originated as a portmanteau of Corvette and Bel Air, a name first applied in 1954 to a Corvette-based concept with a hardtop fastback-styled roof, part of the Motorama traveling exhibition. When applied to the production models, the "air" part referenced the engine's cooling system.

A prominent aspect of the Corvair's legacy derives from controversy surrounding its handling, brought to light by Ralph Nader's Unsafe at Any Speed and tempered by a 1972 Texas A&M University safety commission report for the National Highway Traffic Safety Administration which found that the 1960–1963 Corvair possessed no greater potential for loss of control in extreme situations than its contemporaries.

Chevrolet would more directly compete with imports the size of the Volkswagen Beetle with the subcompact Chevrolet Vega a year after Corvair production ended from 1970 to 1977.  Today the Corvair has a devoted following among owners and collectors as average prices for Corvairs from any year have reached an all-time high.

History

In 1952, Ed Cole was promoted to chief engineer of the Chevrolet Motor Division. Four years later, in July 1956, he was named General Manager of Chevrolet (GM's largest automotive division) and became a vice president of General Motors. At Chevrolet, Cole pushed for many of the major engineering and design advancements introduced in the Chevrolet car and truck lines between 1955 and 1962. He was completely involved in the development and production of the air-cooled rear-engine Corvair. The Corvair was a ground-breaking car in its day. As chief engineer, Cole was also heavily involved in the development of the Corvette sports car. He is also known as the "father" of the small-block Chevy V8, one of the most celebrated engines in American automotive history.

The first time Chevrolet manufactured an air-cooled engine was briefly in 1923 with the Chevrolet Series M Copper-Cooled, which due to engineering challenges, was deemed a failure.

By the late 1950s, the physical size of the entry-level models offered by the Big Three American domestic auto manufacturers (General Motors, Ford, and Chrysler) had grown considerably; effectively abandoning the market for the smaller vehicles that had been available in the past. A successful modern "compact car" market segment was established in the U.S. by the 1950 Nash Rambler. Growing sales of imports from Europe, such as Volkswagen, Renault, Fiat and others, showed that demand existed in the U.S. market for small cars, often as a second car or an alternative for budget-minded consumers. While the "Big Three" continued to introduce ever-larger cars during the 1950s, the new American Motors Corporation (AMC) focused its business strategy on smaller-sized and fuel-efficient automobiles, years before a real need for them existed. AMC, a far smaller company than the "Big Three", positioned itself as a "dinosaur-fighter" (underdog); its compact Rambler models helped push AMC to third place in domestic automobile sales. American Motors also reincarnated its predecessor company's smallest Nash model as the "new" 1958 Rambler American for a second model run, an almost unheard-of phenomenon in automobile history. In 1959, Studebaker followed AMC's formula by restyling its mainstream economy-model sedan, calling it the Lark and billing it as a compact. The Lark success helped give Studebaker a respite for several years before the company ceased automobile production in 1966.

During 1959 and 1960, the Big Three automakers planned to introduce their own "compact" cars. Ford and Chrysler's designs were scaled-down versions of the conventional American car, using six-cylinder engines instead of V8s, and with bodies about 20% smaller than their standard cars.

An exception to this strategy was the Chevrolet Corvair. Chevrolet designed a car that deviated from traditional American norms of design, powered by an air-cooled, horizontally opposed six-cylinder engine with many major components in aluminum. The engine was mounted in the rear of the car, driving the rear wheels through a compact transaxle. The suspension was independent on all four wheels. Bodywork used monocoque rather than body-on-frame construction. The tires were a wider, low-profile design mounted on wider wheels. The styling was unconventional for Detroit, with no tail-fins or chrome grille. Its engineering earned numerous patents. Time magazine put Ed Cole and the Corvair on the cover, and Motor Trend named the Corvair as the 1960 "Car of the Year".

Overview
Corvairs sold more than 200,000 in each of its first six model years. Chevrolet claimed that the rear-engine design offered packaging and economy advantages, providing the car with a lower silhouette, flat passenger compartment floor, no need for power-assisted steering or brakes as well as improvements in ride quality, traction, and braking balance. The design also attracted customers of other makes, primarily imports. The Corvair stood out, with engineering different from other American offerings. It used GM's Z-body, with design and engineering that advanced the rear-engine, rear-wheel-drive layout, which at the time had recently been re-popularized by cars including the Tatra 77, Tucker 48, Fiat 500, Porsche 356, Volkswagen Beetle, Renault Dauphine, Subaru 360, and NSU Prinz, and employed by the concurrent and short-lived Hino Contessa.

In 1962, Subaru built a prototype sedan with an air-cooled flat four engine and installed it in front of the vehicle with front wheel drive. The prototype was not placed into production but the technology was modified and introduced in 1966 as the Subaru 1000 using a water-cooled flat four engine.

The Corvair's engine was an overhead-valve aluminum, air-cooled  flat-six (later enlarged, first to 145 and then to 164 cubic inches). The first Corvair engine produced . Power peaked with the 1965–66 turbocharged  Corsa engine option. The first generation model's swing axle rear suspension, invented and patented by engineer Edmund Rumpler in 1903, offered a comfortable ride. The design was replaced in 1965 model year with a fully independent trailing arm rear suspension similar to that of the Corvette Sting Ray.

Corvair production reached 1,835,170 produced from 1960 until 1969.

The 1960 Corvair and designers William L. "Bill" Mitchell and styling staff received an Industrial Designers Institute (IDI of NY) award.

First generation (1960–1964)

The 1960 Corvair Body Styles 569 and 769 four-door sedans were conceived as economy cars offering few amenities to keep the price competitive, with the 500 Series selling for $2,038 ($ in  dollars ). The Corvair's unique design included the "Quadri-Flex" independent suspension and "Unipack Power Team" of engine, transmission, and rear axle combined into a single unit. Similar to designs of European cars such as Porsche, Volkswagen, Mercedes-Benz, and others, "Quadri-Flex" used coil springs at all four wheels with independent rear suspension arms incorporated at the rear. Specially designed 6.5 by 13-inch four-ply tires mounted on 5.5 by 13 inch wheels were standard equipment. Available options included RPO 360, the Powerglide two-speed automatic transmission ($146), RPO 118, a gasoline heater ($74), RPO 119, an AM tube radio ($54), and by February 1960, the rear folding seat (formerly $32) was made standard. Chevrolet produced 47,683 of the 569 model and 139,208 769 model deluxe sedans in 1960.

In January 1960 two-door coupe models were introduced designated as the 527 and 727 body styles.  Despite their late January introduction of the coupe, these cars sold well; about 14,628 base model 527 coupes, 36,562 model 727 deluxe coupes. Following the success of the upmarket "Mr. and Mrs. Monza" styling concept cars at the 1960 Chicago Auto Show, management approved the neatly appointed bucket-seat DeLuxe trim of the 900 series Monza as a two-door club coupe only. The new Monza began arriving at Chevrolet dealers in April 1960 with sales of 11,926 Monza club coupes, making the coupe one of the most popular Corvairs.

The success of the Monza model showed Chevrolet management that the compact Corvair was viewed as more of a specialty car than a competitor in the economy segment to the conventionally designed Ford Falcon or Chrysler's Valiant. Chevrolet began a design program that resulted in the 1962 Chevy II, a conventional layout compact.

The option of a more powerful engine for the Corvair was introduced in February 1960. In its first year, it was available on any Corvair model with a manual transmission.

The advertised February introduction of a full synchromesh, four-speed transmission (RPO 651) was postponed until the 1961 model year. This was due to casting problems with the aluminum three-speed transmission case which resulted in technical service bulletins to dealers advising of the potential for differential failure due to external leaks at the front of the transmission's counter gear shaft. The revision of the four-speed transmission designated for 1961 introduction incorporated a cast-iron case and a redesign of the differential pinion shaft to interface with a longer transmission output shaft and a concentric pilot for the revised transmission case. These are among many of the improvements undertaken by Chevrolet by the end of the 1960 model year.

The Corvair was Motor Trend magazine's Car of the Year for 1960.

In 1961, Chevrolet introduced the Monza upscale trim to the four-door sedans and the club coupe body styles. With its newly introduced four-speed floor-mounted transmission, DeLuxe vinyl bucket seats, and upscale trim, the Monza Club Coupe gained in sales, as nearly 110,000 were produced along with 33,745 Monza four-door sedans. The four-speed Monza caught the attention of the younger market and was sometimes referred to as "the poor man's Porsche" in various car magazines. The Monza series contributed to about half of the Corvair sales in 1961.

A station wagon, marketed as the Lakewood, joined the lineup in 1961 with its engine located under the cargo floor and offering 68 ft³ (1.9 m³) of cargo room; 58 ft³ in the main passenger compartment, and another 10 ft³ in the front trunk. The base engine was still rated at  when paired with the manual transmissions but this increased to  when mated to the optional automatic transmission in Monza models. To increase luggage capacity in the front trunk, the spare tire was relocated to the engine compartment (in cars without air conditioning) and new "direct air" heater directed warmed air from the cylinders and heads to the passenger compartment. The gasoline heater remained available as an option through 1963. Factory air conditioning was offered as a mid-1961 option introduction. The condenser lay flat atop the horizontal engine fan. A large, green-painted reverse rotation version of the standard GM Frigidaire air-conditioning compressor was used, and an evaporator housing was added under the dash with integrated outlets surrounding the radio housing. Air conditioning was not available on wagons, Greenbrier/Corvair 95, or the turbocharged models introduced later, due to space constraints. Chevrolet also introduced the Corvair 95 line of light-duty trucks and vans, using the Corvair Powerpack with forward-control, or "cab over", with the driver sitting over the front wheels, as in the Volkswagen Type 2.

The Greenbrier Sportswagon used the same body as the "Corvan 95" panel van with the side windows option, but was marketed as a station wagon and was available with trim and paint options similar to the passenger cars. The "Corvan 95" model was also built in pickup versions; the Loadside was a fairly typical pickup of the era, except for the rear engine, forward controls, and a pit in the middle of the bed. The more popular Rampside had a unique, large, fold-down ramp on the side of the bed for ease of loading wheeled items.

In 1962, Chevrolet introduced the Corvairs with few changes at the beginning of the year. The bottom line 500 series station wagon was dropped and the 700 became the base station wagon. The "Lakewood" name was dropped. The ever-popular Monza line then took on a wagon model to round out the top of the line. In spring of 1962, Chevrolet committed itself to the sporty image they had created for the Corvair by introducing a convertible version, then offering a high-performance  turbocharged "Spyder" option for Monza coupes and convertibles, making the Corvair the second production automobile supplied with a turbocharger as a factory option, with the Oldsmobile F-85 Turbo Jetfire having been released earlier in 1962. Corvair station wagons were discontinued at that point in favor the new Corvair Convertible and Chevy II (built at the same assembly plant). The slow-selling Loadside pickup was discontinued at the end of the model year. The rest of the Corvair 95 line of Forward Control vehicles continued. Optional equipment on all passenger cars (except wagons) included metallic brake linings and a heavy-duty suspension consisting of a front anti-roll bar, rear-axle limit straps, revised spring rates, and recalibrated shock absorbers. These provided a major handling improvement by reducing the potentially violent camber change of the rear wheels when making sharp turns at high speeds. The Turbocharged Spyder equipment group featured a multi-gauge instrument cluster which included a tachometer, cylinder head temperature, and intake manifold pressure gauges, Spyder fender script, and Turbo logo deck emblems, in addition to the high-performance engine.

The Monza Coupe was the most popular model with 151,738 produced out of 292,531 total Corvair passenger car production for 1962. John Fitch, chose the Corvair as the basis for "Sprint" models. These included various performance improvements along with appearance modifications. Individual components were available to customers and several Chevrolet dealers became authorized to install the "Sprint" conversions.

The 1963 model year had the optional availability of a long 3.08 gear for improved fuel economy, but the Corvair otherwise remained largely carryover with minor trim and engineering changes. Self-adjusting brakes were new for 1963. Of all the Corvairs sold in 1963, fully 80% were Monzas. The convertible model accounted for over 20% of all the Monzas sold.

Significant engineering changes were introduced for 1964, while the model lineup and styling remained relatively unchanged. The Spyder engine rating remained at  despite the displacement increase of the engine. In 1964, an improvement in the car's swing axle rear suspension occurred with the addition of a transverse leaf spring along with softer rear coil springs designed to diminish rear roll stiffness and foster more neutral handling. Spring rates could now be softer at both ends of the car compared to previous models. The heavy-duty suspension was no longer optional, although all models now had a front anti-roll bar as standard. Brakes were improved with finned rear drums. The remaining pickup, the Rampside, was discontinued at the end of the model year.

Despite a vastly improved 1964 model, Corvair sales declined by close to 73,000 units that year. This was attributed to a number of factors, including the basic styling being 5 years old, the lack of a pillarless hardtop (which virtually all competing compact models had), the lack of a V8 engine, and the introduction of the Ford Mustang on 17 April, which broke all records for sales of a new car (and cut into Corvair sales).

Second generation (1965–1969)

The Corvair second generation arrived for model year 1965, noted for its lack of a "B" pillar and a new fully independent suspension replacing the original swing axle rear suspension. The Corvair used coil springs at each wheel.

Car and Driver magazine's David E. Davis Jr. showed enthusiasm for the 1965 Corvair in their October 1964 issue:

And it is here too, that we have to go on record and say that the Corvair is in our opinion—the most important new car of the entire crop of '65 models, and the most beautiful car to appear in this country since before World War II. ...When the pictures of the '65 Corvair arrived in our offices, the man who opened the envelope actually let out a great shout of delight and amazement on first seeing the car, and in thirty seconds the whole staff was charging around, each wanting to be the first to show somebody else, each wanting the vicarious kick of hearing that characteristic war-whoop from the first-time viewer. […] Our ardor had cooled a little by the time we got to drive the cars—then we went nuts all over again. The new rear suspension, the new softer spring rates in front, the bigger brakes, the addition of some more power, all these factors had us driving around like idiots—zooming around the handling loop dragging with each other, standing on the brakes—until we had to reluctantly turn the car over to some other impatient journalist. […] The '65 Corvair is an outstanding car. It doesn't go fast enough, but we love it.

The standard  and optional  engines were carried forward from 1964. The previous  Spyder engine was replaced by the normally aspirated  for the new Corsa. The engine was unusual in offering four single-throat carburetors, to which were added larger valves and a dual exhaust system. A  turbocharged engine was optional on the Corsa, which offered either standard three-speed or optional (US$92) four-speed manual transmissions. The  engine was optional on 500 and Monza models with manual or Powerglide transmissions. All engines got some of the heavy-duty internal parts from the Turbocharged engine for better durability.

New refinements appeared on the 1965 redesign. The Corsa came standard with an instrument panel featuring a  speedometer with resettable trip odometer, a 6,000 rpm tachometer, cylinder head temperature gauge, analog clock with a sweeping second hand, a manifold vacuum/pressure gauge and fuel gauge. A much better heater system, larger brakes borrowed from the Chevelle, a stronger differential ring gear, an alternator (replacing the generator), and significant chassis refinements were made. A new fully articulated rear suspension virtually eliminated the danger of the previous generation's swing axles and was based on the contemporary Corvette Sting Ray (Corvair used coil springs while the Sting Ray uses a transverse leaf). Additionally, an AM/FM stereo radio, in-dash All Weather Air Conditioning, telescopically adjustable steering column, and a Special Purpose Chassis Equipment ("Z17") handling package, consisting of a special performance suspension and quick ratio steering box, were new options for 1965. The Monza and Corvair 500 Sport Sedans were the only compact cars ever available in the U.S. as pillarless four-door hardtops.

The station wagon, panel van, and pickup body styles had all been dropped and 1965 was the last year for the Greenbrier window van, which was retained mainly for fleet orders, with 1,528 being built. In all, 235,528 Corvairs were built in 1965, an increase of 30,000 units over 1964. Chevrolet replaced the Corvair-based vans with the Chevrolet Sportvan/GMC Handi-Van, which used a traditional front-engine/rear-drive axle borrowed from the Chevy II.

The 1966 lineup remained essentially unchanged from 1965. One change of note was a new four-speed synchromesh transmission using the standard Saginaw gear set with 3.11:1 first gear ratio used by other GM 6-cylinder vehicles. The steering column was changed to a two-piece design with a universal joint, lessening the danger of intrusion during a front-end collision (actually a mid-1965 running change). A plastic air dam was installed below the front valence panel to conceal the front suspension and underbody, and lessen crosswind sensitivity. In front, The "lock door" emblem (covering the lockset for the trunk lock) was changed from red to blue and featured a shorter bar. At the rear, new larger taillight lenses were used featuring a thin chrome ring around the center of the light. Air conditioned cars received a new condenser that was mounted in front of the engine, eliminating the previous unit mounted atop the engine, requiring its removal for most engine service. The Corvair script nameplate was moved from atop the trunk lid to a position next to the driver's side headlight bezel. Sales began a decline as a result of Ralph Nader's book highlighting the Corvair's deficiencies – and the new Mustang offering V8s up to  compared to the Corvair's  top powertrain. Rumors of the upcoming "Panther" – the code name for the forthcoming Camaro, slated as a direct competitor for the Mustang – further undercut sales. A decision was made to discontinue further development of the Corvair. Production for the model year was down to 103,743.

In 1967, the Corvair line was trimmed to the 500 and Monza Hardtop Coupes and Hardtop Sedans, and the Monza Convertible. This model year was the first with a collapsible steering column. A dual circuit master cylinder with warning light, nylon reinforced brake hoses, stronger steel (instead of aluminum) door hinges, "mushroomed" instrument panel knobs, and a vinyl-edged day/night mirror were all made standard equipment. Bucket seats in Monza models were now of the same "Astro" style as those on the new-for-1967 Camaro, featuring a new-thin-shell design. Chevrolet introduced a  engine warranty on all Chevrolet models including the Corvair. Chevrolet was still actively marketing the Corvair in 1967, including color print ads and an "I Love My Corvair" bumper sticker campaign by dealers, but production and sales continued to fall off drastically. Only 27,253 copies were built. The chrome rings around the center of the taillights were made thicker.

In 1968, the four-door hardtop was discontinued, leaving three models – the 500 and Monza Hardtop Coupes and the Monza Convertible. Air conditioning was dropped as an option, due to concerns about thermal loading added by the now-standard Air Injection Reactor ("smog pump") which probably hurt sales as factory air became more popular generally in automobiles. The GM multiplex stereo system was also discontinued when new units changed wiring adapters; the Corvair's 9-pin connector would no longer fit the new units. Additional safety features, including side marker lights, and shoulder belts for closed models, were fitted per the federal government's requirements. The steering wheel for 500s was the same as the base Nova's, while Monzas got the same wheel as the Camaro. An Impala-style "Deluxe" steering wheel was optional. All advertising was stopped and sales were down to 15,400.

The final 1969 model-year Corvairs were assembled with the Nova in Willow Run, Michigan, the same facility Corvairs had been built from the beginning. A total of 6,000 Corvairs were produced of which only 521 were Monza Convertibles. The Corvair was the only GM car in 1969 that did not get a locking steering column. Demand for Novas was high and a decision was made in November 1968 to move Corvair assembly to a special off-line area in the plant, dubbed the "Corvair Room", making Corvairs produced between that time and 14 May 1969 essentially hand-built by a dedicated Corvair team. Assembled bodies arrived from Fisher Body and awaited assembly in the off-line area.

End of production
While the 1965 Corvair was received as a well-engineered high-performance driver's car, that accomplishment was overshadowed by the phenomenal market success of the Ford Mustang. GM saw advantages to the route adopted by Ford with the Mustang, a four-seat semi-coupe body on a standard compact (Falcon) chassis with a small-block V8 motor and four-on-the-floor offered as power options. The Corvair was not cheap to produce; developing and marketing a Mustang-style model based on the Nova platform had cost advantages. Unlike the Corvair, a derivative model could evolve within GM's standard lines of manufacturing technology. The 1965 publication of Unsafe at Any Speed sullied the reputation of the Corvair line, although the issues had nothing to do with the current model. Under competition from the Mustang and the publicity hit of Unsafe, Corvair sales plummeted by over half in 1966. GM saw the advantages of developing the Camaro, not the Corvair.

According to GM historian Dave Newell, Chevrolet had planned on ending Corvair production after the 1966 model year. Development and engineering changes were halted in 1966 on the year-old, redesigned second-generation cars with mainly federally mandated emissions and safety changes made thereafter. An increasing lack of interest from the company, especially from Chevrolet's General Manager John DeLorean, and a complete absence of Corvair advertising after 1967 reflected the company's priorities, including promotion of three redesigned models for 1968 – the Corvette, Chevelle, and Chevy II Nova. The Corvair was referred to as "the phantom" by Car Life magazine in their 1968 Monza road test, and by 1969 Chevrolet's Corvair four-page brochure was "by request only". During its final year of production, 6,000 cars were produced.

Chevrolet had proposed a third generation (1970 onward) Corvair, essentially a re-skin of the 1965–69 model resembling the 1973 GM A Body intermediates, particularly the 1973 Pontiac Grand Am, retaining Corvair proportions. Having passed the point of full-scale clay models, Chevrolet stopped developing the model in early 1968. Unlike the Turbo Hydramatic 400, the Turbo Hydramatic 350 transmission, introduced in the 1968 Camaro and later adopted by most Chevrolet models had been configured for use in the third generation Corvair.

Handling problems

The first-generation Corvair featured a rear engine + swing axle design similar to that of the Renault Dauphine and Volkswagen Beetle – a design which eliminates universal joints at the wheels and keeps the rear wheels perpendicular to the half-shafts, rather than the road surface. The design can allow rear tires to undergo large camber angle changes during fast cornering due to side g-forces causing "rebound" camber and decreasing the tread contact with the road surface, leading to a loss of rear wheel grip and oversteer – a dynamically unstable condition where a driver can lose control and spin. The problem is most severe in combinations having the engine and swing axle at the same end of the car: in most cases this is at the rear, and the Corvair is no exception. The rebound camber is worse because of the greater inertial mass over the rear wheels with this combination; the higher center of gravity during rebound causes additional problems. A station wagon body also exacerbates the tendency because it increases the weight at the rear (and raises the center of gravity). Oversteer is exacerbated by deceleration during cornering due to increased side g-force and lightened load on rear tires (lift-off oversteer). Understeer is common in front-engine cars due to more weight, and inertia, on the front tires. Both conditions are dangerous when a car is driven at its cornering limits. Design options to ameliorate swing axle handling:
 Anti-roll bar: As a production option, engineers had advocated but management rejected the inclusion of a front anti-roll bar on the original 1960 Corvair, which would have ameliorated the car's handling – shifting weight transfer to the front outboard tire, considerably reducing rear slip angles – thereby avoiding potential oversteer.
 Tire pressure differential: As with the Renault Dauphine and pre-1968 Volkswagen Beetle, Corvair engineers relied on a cost-free tire pressure differential to eliminate oversteer characteristics – low front and high rear tire pressure –a strategy which induced understeer (increasing front slip angles faster than the rear). Nonetheless, the strategy offered a significant disadvantage: owners and mechanics could inadvertently but easily re-introduce oversteer characteristics by over-inflating the front tires (e.g., to typical pressures for other cars with other, more prevalent suspension systems). The recommended low front tire pressure also compromised the tire load capacity.

While the Corvair sedan offered competent handling, "the average buyer more accustomed to front-engined cars, did not take [into] account the car's different handling characteristics." Chevrolet made a succession of improvements to the first-generation Corvair suspension. For the 1962 model year, the front anti-roll bar became available as an option. For the 1964 model year, the front anti-roll bar became standard equipment and the rear suspension was modified to include a camber compensating, transverse-mounted leaf spring extending between the rear wheels to limit rear wheel camber change, and carrying much of the rear weight combined with softer coil springs.

For the 1965 model year, the Corvair received a fully independent rear suspension closely resembling that of the contemporary Corvette. The redesigned suspension reduced the rear roll center to half its previous height, using fully articulated half-axles that offered constant camber on the rear tires in all driving situations. This eliminated the handling problems of the first-generation models.

Legal fallout
Consumer protection activist Ralph Nader addressed the handling issues of the first-generation (1960–1963) Corvair in his 1965 book, Unsafe at Any Speed. GM had over 100 lawsuits pending in connection with crashes involving the Corvair, which subsequently became the initial material for Nader's investigations. The book highlighted crashes related to the Corvair's suspension and identified the Chevrolet suspension engineer who had fought management's decision to omit – for cost reasons – the front anti-roll bar installed on later models. Nader said during subsequent Congressional hearings, the Corvair is "the leading candidate for the un-safest-car title". Subsequently, Corvair sales fell from 220,000 in 1965 to 109,880 in 1966. By 1968, production fell to 14,800. Public response to the book played a role in the National Traffic and Motor Vehicle Safety Act in 1966.

A 1972 safety commission report conducted by Texas A&M University concluded that the 1960–1963 Corvair possessed no greater potential for loss of control than its contemporary competitors in extreme situations. The U.S. Department of Transportation (DOT) issued a press release in 1972 describing the findings of NHTSA testing from the previous year. NHTSA had conducted a series of comparative tests in 1971 studying the handling of the 1963 Corvair and four contemporary cars – a Ford Falcon, Plymouth Valiant, Volkswagen Beetle, and Renault Dauphine – along with a second-generation Corvair (with its completely redesigned, independent rear suspension). The 143-page report reviewed NHTSA's extreme-condition handling tests, national crash-involvement data for the cars in the test as well as General Motors' internal documentation regarding the Corvair's handling. NHTSA went on to contract an independent advisory panel of engineers to review the tests. This review panel concluded that "the 1960–63 Corvair compares favorably with contemporary vehicles used in the tests [...] the handling and stability performance of the 1960–63 Corvair does not result in an abnormal potential for loss of control or rollover, and it is at least as good as the performance of some contemporary vehicles both foreign and domestic." Former GM executive and automotive engineer John DeLorean asserted in his book On a Clear Day You Can See General Motors that Nader's criticisms were valid.

Journalist David E. Davis, in a 2009 article in Automobile Magazine, noted that despite Nader's claim that swing-axle rear suspension were dangerous, Porsche, Mercedes-Benz, Tatra, and Volkswagen all used similar swing-axle concepts during that era. (The handling of other rear-engine swing-axle cars, particularly the Volkswagen Type I and II, has been criticized as well.) Some contend that Nader's lack of an automotive engineering degree or a driver's license at the time he wrote Unsafe at Any Speed disqualifies him as a critic of automotive safety. In response to Nader's book, Mechanix Illustrated reviewer Tom McCahill tried to get a 1963 Corvair to flip, at one point sliding sideways into a street curb, but could not turn over the vehicle.

Reception
Time featured Ed Cole and the 1960 Corvair on its cover for the Corvair introduction in 1959 and said: "its fresh engineering is hailed as the forerunner of a new age of innovation in Detroit." Time reported in 1960: Chevrolet sold 26,000 Corvairs its first two days on the market, taking over 35% of Chevy's two-day total of 75,000. Chevrolet had intended to sell one Corvair for every five Chevrolets. By March 1960, the Corvair comprised 13% of Chevrolet's sales. Shortly after its introduction, the Corvair faced competition from the Ford Falcon and Mercury Comet and was plagued by problems,  although according to a 1960 Time report, "many were the minor bugs that often afflict a completely new car." Problems included an engine cooling fan belt that tended to pop off its 2-axis pulleys (unless the fan ran constantly, the air-cooled engine would overheat and seize), carburetor icing and poor fuel mileage "which sometimes runs well under 20 m.p.g." The 1960 model gasoline heater was cited as a problem, which itself could consume up to a quart of gas an hour – with Chevrolet engineers quickly modifying the Corvair's carburetors to improve economy.

Motor Trend awarded the Corvair its "Car of the Year" award for 1960.

Legacy and reputation
The Corvair's reputation and legacy, as well as those of General Motors, were tarnished by accusations about its handling ability; the car was scrutinized in Ralph Nader's 1965 book Unsafe at Any Speed. Ralph Nader's accusations were proven false by the 1972 National Highway Traffic Safety Administration safety commission report. Support for the tests, conducted at College Station, Texas, was provided by the Texas Transportation Institute (TTl) Texas A&M University Research Foundation. The investigation concluded:

The 1960–1963 Corvair understeers in the same manner as conventional passenger cars up to about 0.4 g lateral acceleration, makes a transition from understeer, through neutral steer, to oversteer in a range from about 0.4 g to 0.5 g lateral acceleration. This transition does not result in the abnormal potential for loss of control. The limited accident data available indicates that the rollover rate of the 1960–1963 Corvair is comparable to other light domestic cars. The 1960–1963 Corvair compared favorably with the other contemporary vehicles used in the NHTSA Input Response Tests. The handling and stability performance of the 1960–1963 Corvair does not result in an abnormal potential for loss of control or rollover and it is at least as good as the performance of some contemporary vehicles both foreign and domestic.

Greenbrier Sportswagon

In addition to its other body styles, Chevrolet marketed the Corvair also in van and pickup body styles, in rear-load or side-load configurations, as the Corvair Greenbrier.

Production notes

Production plants
All locations are cars only, except as noted:
 Willow Run Assembly, Ypsilanti, MI 1960–69
 Leeds Assembly Plant, Kansas City, MO 1960–61
 Oakland Assembly, Oakland, CA 1960–63
 Van Nuys Assembly Van Nuys, CA 1963, 1965 & 1966
 St. Louis Truck Assembly, St. Louis, MO 1961–65 (FCs)
 Flint Truck Assembly, Flint, MI 1961–64 (FCs)
 Oshawa Car Assembly, Oshawa, Ontario 1960–66
 Mexico City 1961–63 (CKD)
 Caracas, Venezuela 1960–62 (CKD)
 Bienne, Switzerland 1960–67 (CKD)
 Antwerp, Belgium 1960–67 (CKD)
 Copenhagen, Denmark 1960–61
 Port Elizabeth, South Africa 1960–62 (All 1960 CKD models)

Willow Run, Kansas City, Oakland, and Van Nuys were all Chevrolet assembly plants with adjacent Fisher Body plants.

St. Louis and Flint were Chevrolet truck plants, although Chevy had full-size car plants in both cities and in St. Louis the plants were adjacent.

Oshawa was operated solely by GM of Canada Ltd.

The CKD plants were operated by GM Overseas Operations (GMOO).

Model designations

Rampside – Corvair pickup with a ramp on one side that was available 1961–1964

500 – base model Corvair with lowest trim level. Always came with rubber mats, bench seats, and very little trim.

700 – next trim level up from the 500 model. These models also came with rubber mats and bench seats, but had more extensive exterior trim and additional features as standard. (this model was discontinued after 1964).

Lakewood – Corvair station wagon (1961–62) available as a 500 or 700. The Monza wagon was available in 1962 and is not really a Lakewood. All window glass was specific to this model due to its taller roofline.

Monza (900) – the top of the trim line for 1960–1963 only. In 1964, it was below the Monza Spyder, which was now its own model. For the 1965–66 model year, the Monza ranked below the Corsa in trim level. After the Corsa model was dropped, the Monza was once again at the top of the Corvair line for 1967 through 1969. Monzas usually came with bucket seats (although special bench seats were available in some years). Monzas had carpeting and special trim packages.

Spyder – the Monza Spyder was an option package during the 1962 and 1963 model years, and for 1964 became a full-fledged model. It was equipped with a  turbocharged engine, "full instrumentation", special emblems, and all the "Monza" trim items.

Corsa – top of the line sport model for 1965–66. It was the only model available with the optional  turbocharged flat-six. The base engine was the new four-carburetor  "big valve" engine. Corsas had "full instrumentation", special emblems, and trim with a special "argent" silver painted rear cove area and pinstriping on the 1965 models. The optional 180 hp engine delivered an increase in power over the 1964 150 hp engine of the same displacement by slightly enlarging the carburetor, and increasing the size of the internal impeller and turbine blades.

Corvan (95) – Corvair panel van that was available 1961–1964

Greenbrier – a windowed van that was available 1961–1965

Loadside – Corvair pickup without the ramp which was available 1961 and 1962

Deluxe – option package of upgraded interior and trim available on some of the "van" models

F.C. (forward control) – a Chevy term that applied to all Corvair 95 van models indicating that the driver and controls were forward of the front wheels

Concept cars

The Corvair spawned a number of innovative concept vehicles including the Corvair SS, Monza GT, Monza SS, and Astro I. In Europe, Italian coachbuilder Bertone designed a very advanced one-off prototype for the 1963 Geneva Motor Show; the "Chevrolet Testudo". This was among the first designs of Giorgetto Giugiaro, the chief designer at Bertone at the time. The Testudo later suffered a collision with another Bertone concept car, the Alfa Romeo Canguro, while on track at the Monza circuit. There was also a Pininfarina built concept called the "Corvair Speciale", and two other Pininfarina concepts known as "Coupe I" and "Coupe II".

The Chevrolet Corvair Monza GT coupe toured together with the Monza SS (Spyder) in early 1963, making a public appearance at the New York International Auto Show. Although both cars were based on the Corvair drivetrain, each represented a futuristic development of the Corvair design. In the SS convertible, the engine (with a four-carburetor setup) was left in its stock location behind the transaxle, allowing for a shorter wheelbase. The Monza GT is housed at the GM's Heritage Center in Detroit.

A 1966 concept vehicle, the Electrovair II was a 1966 Monza 4-door hardtop modified with a 532 volt,  electric motor replacing the gasoline engine – following a 1964 version known as Electrovair I. With the 1966 model, silver-zinc batteries were used and placed in the trunk and engine compartment, and the body was slightly modified to accept the conversion. The car was handicapped by the high cost of the batteries ($160,000), a limited driving range, and short battery life.

Racing and modified Corvairs

Yenko Stinger

Don Yenko, who had been racing Corvettes, could not compete successfully against the Carroll Shelby Mustangs after they arrived on the scene. Yenko decided to race modified Corvairs, beginning with the 1966 model. As the stock Corvair did not fit into any of the SCCA categories, Yenko modified four-carburetor Corsas into "sports cars" by removing the back seat and introducing various performance improvements. As the SCCA required 100 cars to be manufactured to homologate the model for production racing, Yenko completed 100 Stingers in one month in 1965. Although all were white, as the SCCA required for American cars at the time,  [the normal competition trim for U.S.-built cars was white with 2 blue stripes] there was a great deal of variety between individual cars; some had exterior modifications including fiberglass engine covers with spoilers, some did not; some received engine upgrades developing 160, 190, 220, or 240 hp (119, 142, 164, or 179 kW). All were equipped by the Chevrolet factory with heavy-duty suspension, four-speed transmission, quicker steering ratio, "positraction" limited-slip differentials (50 with 3.89 gears, and 50 with 3.55 after Chevrolet discontinued the 3.89) and dual brake master cylinders (the first application of this by Chevrolet, to become standard equipment the next year). Because most of the engine cooling in air-cooled engines is done by circulating oil, an oil cooler was necessary for competition use, this was mounted externally on the rear body section above the left wheel.

The Stingers competed in Class D production dominated by the Triumph TR4. In its first race in January 1966, the Stinger finished in second by only one second. By the end of the 1966 season, Jerry Thompson had won the Central Division Championship and placed fifth in the 1966 Nationals, Dick Thompson, a successful Corvette race driver, had won the Northeast Division Championship, and Jim Spencer had won the Central Division Championship, with Dino Milani taking second place. The next year, Chevrolet dropped the Corsa line. The Monza line was initially not available with the 4-carburetor engine. These were eventually offered as a special performance option, along with the 3.89 differential. The Monza instrumentation did not have a tachometer or head temperature gauges, which had to be separately installed. The SCCA, on the other hand, had relaxed its ruling regarding color, and the cars were available in red or blue. It is believed that only fourteen 1967 Stingers were built. Dana Chevrolet distributed Stingers on the U.S. West coast and ordered an additional three similar cars to be built to Stinger specifications, but with the AIR injection system to meet California emissions laws, with Yenko's permission. A total of 185 Stingers are believed to have been built, the last being YS-9700 built for Goodyear Tire and Rubber Company as a tire test vehicle in 1969–1970.

Fitch Sprint
Longtime roadracer John Fitch was particularly interested in the Corvair as the basis for a spirited road and track-oriented car, due to its handling. Body options such as spoilers were available, but the most visually remarkable option was the "Ventop", a fiberglass overlay for the C-pillars and rear of the roof that gave the car a "flying buttress" profile.

Fitch went on to design and build a prototype of the Fitch Phoenix, a Corvair-based two-seat sports car, superficially resembling a smaller version of the Mako Shark based Corvette. The ability to produce automobiles on a small scale, along with Chevrolet's decision to terminate production of the Corvair, meant the end of Fitch's plan. He still retained the prototype, and occasionally exhibited it at car shows until his death. On 1 June 2014, the Fitch Phoenix went to auction at Bonhams in the Greenwich Concours and sold for 230,000 US dollars. The car is still in Connecticut with the new owner.

In the early 1970s, Fitch sold his inventory to Art Hershberger of Princeton, Wisconsin. Hershberger made minor styling modifications to several Corvairs and sold them as Solar Sprints and Solar Cavaliers. The main distinguishing feature of the Solar was its Camaro taillights.

Winfield's cars: Reactor & Piranha
Gene Winfield, the automotive customizer, built two models in the mid 1960s that used the unique qualities of the lightweight and low Corvair engine.

The Reactor came when Winfield was tasked with showing the benefits of an aluminum bodied car. What he developed was an extremely low slung two seat front-mid-engine, front-wheel-drive car. He used the 180 hp turbocharged engine from the Corvair Corsa. Other drivetrain components came from the Citroën DS, including the front wheel drive transaxle and height adjustable suspension. Winfield was able to place this vehicle in the 1960s television programs Star Trek, Batman, and Bewitched.

A sports racing car – the Piranha – was developed around the same time, to demonstrate the use of a new plastic for the structural parts of the automobile – Cyclic ABS. This lightweight (1,400 lb) vehicle was developed in several generations, using a rear-mounted Corvair engine. Model car company Aluminum Model Toys began small scale production of actual cars through their division run by Gene Winfield. Winfield was able to obtain feature placement of this car on television as The U.N.C.L.E. Car in The Man from U.N.C.L.E.

Custom, dune buggies and aircraft
Corvair flat-six engines were a popular alternative to Volkswagen engines in dune buggy applications and off-road racing. Corvair engines have been used to power light and experimental aircraft designs by Pietenpol, Zenith, and Sonex. Much development work on the conversion of Corvair engines into flight-worthy powerplants has been carried out by William Wynne, who among others has been refining the process since the 1980s.

Trans Am
A Corvair was driven by Spurgeon May and Donna Mae Mims in the Trans Am Series in 1966.

The Morrvair 
Matthew Wetzel, owner of the Matt's Off Road Recovery YouTube channel, uses a highly modified Corvair Station Wagon nicknamed "The Morrvair" to recover stuck and disabled vehicles from the deserts of Southern Utah. The Morrvair has been modified to be a front engine vehicle, and features an LS engine, Dana 60 & Dana 70 Axles, a custom built lift kit, and many other modifications typical of an off road vehicle.

Design influence
The first-generation Corvair (1960–1964) has been credited with influencing car design worldwide. Styled in GM's advanced styling studio in 1957, under the leadership of then director Ned Nickels, the compact design was made using cues from earlier Oldsmobile and Chevrolet models. The most notable design feature, its high, wrap-around beltline, was "borrowed" by other carmakers not long after the Corvair's release. These cars included the BMW 1602/2002, NSU Prinz, Hillman Imp, Fiat 1300/1500, Volkswagen Type 34 Karmann Ghia and the Mazda 800.

The Corvair's combination of power and lightweight introduced European manufacturers to an American market niche for small popular-priced sedans with more power and driveability than the contemporary European economy sedans and a more versatile and practical design than European sports cars. That overall concept was exemplified by Volkswagen's Type 34 Karmann Ghia and Type 3 "notchback" in 1961 and BMW's "New Class" sedans in 1962. BMW developed the concept further by mass-marketing higher performance high-quality sedans, setting the trend of the "sport sedan" category that would soon include offerings from a variety of European, and eventually Japanese, manufacturers.

See also
 Chevrolet Corvair Powerglide
 Fiat 1300
 Tatra 613

References

Bibliography

External links

 
 
 Article about the Chevrolet Corvair from the Vinson Collection at Hagley Library
 Filmstrip Advertisement for the Corvair from the Prelinger Archives at archive.org

Cars powered by boxer engines
Cars powered by rear-mounted 6-cylinder engines
Corvair
Corvair
Compact cars
Convertibles
Motor vehicles manufactured in the United States
Pickup trucks
Product safety scandals
Rear-engined vehicles
Sedans